Johan Fredrik Martin (8 June 1755 – 28 September 1816) was a Swedish painter and engraver of the eighteenth century. He worked in a variety of media, especially stipple, contour etching and aquatint.

Biography

Martin was born in Stockholm, Sweden. He was the son of Olof Martin and Ulrika Haupt. The famous landscape painter Elias Martin (1739–1818) was his elder brother; both men had sons who were also painters.

In his youth Martin devoted himself primarily to the art of drawing. He spent the years 1770–1780 in England and received his education there from English graphic artists including William Woollett and Francesco Bartolozzi. At first he worked very close to his brother Elias Martin, but after 1785 he became more independent and made graphic prints for other artists, among them Pehr Hilleström. After his return to Sweden he made graphic works such as Svenska galeriet (2 booklets with 12 portraits and biographies 1782–83).

In 1784–87 Martin undertook several journeys through Sweden to subscribe prospects. In 1797 he published a collection of  prospects over Stockholm , made with etched contours, the contour drawings he treated like watercolors and widely sold. In 1805 he began to develop these and similar drawings in aquatint, and his great work, Svenska vyer arose gradually. His other works include the engraved plates to shield Brands Voyage pittoresque au Cap Nord, as well as plates from Louis Masreliez drawings, his brother Elias's landscape paintings and his drawings of the Bacchus temple. He also made many portraits and engravings on a wide variety of subjects.

Martin was technically very skilled, working in several graphic techniques, especially stipple, contour etching and aquatint. Among his works are the "beautifying theatre view" from the Södermalm district of Stockholm with upper-class audience that is a watercoloured etching after a drawing by his brother Elias from about 1790.

Works

References

Other sources

 Martin, Johan Fredrik in Svenskt biografiskt handlexikon, 1906

External links 

 Illustrated list of artworks on MutualArt
 

18th-century Swedish painters
18th-century Swedish male artists
19th-century Swedish painters
1755 births
1816 deaths
Age of Liberty people
Swedish engravers
Swedish landscape painters
Swedish male painters
19th-century Swedish male artists